ortho-Cresol (IUPAC name: 2-methylphenol, also known as 2-hydroxytoluene or ortho-Toluenol) is an organic compound with the formula CH3C6H4(OH). It is a colourless solid that is widely used intermediate in the production of other chemicals. It is a derivative of phenol and is an isomer of p-cresol and m-cresol.

Natural occurrences 
o-Cresol is one of the chemical compounds found in castoreum. This compound is gathered from the beaver's castor glands and found in the white cedar consumed by the beaver.

o-Cresol is a constituent of tobacco smoke.

Production 
Together with many other compounds, o-cresol is traditionally extracted from coal tar, the volatile materials obtained in the production of coke from coal. A similar source material is petroleum residues.  These residue contains a few percent by weight of phenol and isomeric cresols. In addition to the materials derived from these natural sources, about two thirds of the Western world's supply is produced by methylation of phenol using methanol. The alkylation is catalysed by metal oxides:
C6H5OH + CH3OH → CH3C6H4OH + H2O
Over-methylation gives xylenol. Many other production methods have been examined, including oxidative decarboxylation of salicylic acid, oxygenation of toluene, and hydrolysis of 2-chlorotoluene.

Applications 
o-Cresol is mainly used as a precursor to other compounds. Chlorination and etherification gives members of commercially important herbicides, such as 2-methyl-4-chlorophenoxyacetic acid (MCPA). Nitration gives dinitrocresol, a popular herbicide. Kolbe–Schmitt carboxylation gives o-cresotinic acid, a pharmaceutical intermediate. Carvacrol, essence of oregano, is derived by alkylation of o-cresol with propene. The muscle relaxant mephenesin is an ether derived from o-cresol.

Health effects 
Most exposures to cresols are at very low levels that are not harmful although, like phenols, cresols are skin irritants. When cresols are inhaled, ingested, or applied to the skin at very high levels, they can be harmful. Breathing high levels of cresols for a short time results in irritation of the nose and throat. Aside from these effects, very little is known about the effects of breathing cresols at lower levels over longer times. The acute LD50 for oral ingestion by mice is 344 mg/kg.

References

External links 
 o-CRESOL (ICSC)
 Environmental Science - SMILES Examples Notations (accessed 22 December 2022)
 CDC - NIOSH Pocket Guide to Chemical Hazards

Alkylphenols
Antiseptics
Cresols
Hazardous air pollutants